Reginald Alfred Varney (11 July 1916 – 16 November 2008) was an English actor, entertainer and comedian. He is best remembered for having played the lead role of bus driver Stan Butler in the LWT sitcom On the Buses (1969–73) and its three spin-off feature films. Having performed as a music hall entertainer, Varney first came to national recognition as factory foreman Reg Turner in the BBC sitcom  The Rag Trade (1961–63). He appeared in further sitcoms including Beggar My Neighbour (1966–1968) and On the Buses stardom facilitated overseas cabaret tours.

Early life
Varney was born in Canning Town, Essex (but now part of London), to Sidney Thomas Varney and his wife Annie (née Needham). His father worked in a rubber factory in Silvertown and he was one of five children who grew up in 27 Addington Road, Canning Town. He was educated at the nearby Star Lane Primary School in West Ham and after leaving school at 14, he worked as a messenger boy and a page boy at the Regent Palace Hotel.

Varney took piano lessons as a child and was good enough to find employment as a part-time piano player. His first paid engagement was at Plumstead Radical Club in Woolwich, for which he was paid eight shillings and sixpence (42½p). He also played in working men's clubs, pubs and ABC cinemas, and later sang with big bands of the time. He and his mother decided that show business was the career for him, and he gave up his day jobs. Varney became a solo pianist at the Windmill Theatre in May 1938. In late 1939, he married Lilian E. Flavell (1915-2002) at East Ham.

During the Second World War, Varney joined the Royal Engineers, but continued his performing career as an army entertainer, touring in the Far East for a time. After being demobilised in the late 1940s, he starred on stage in a comic revue entitled Gaytime, with Benny Hill as his partner in a double act. He then became an all-round entertainer, working his way around the music halls.

Career 

Varney had made only a small number of film and TV appearances prior to being cast in the role of long-suffering factory foreman Reg Turner in the BBC television sitcom The Rag Trade (1961–63), which made him a household name. He was aware that he was the only performer without West End acting experience and worked hard to make up for it. Slightly later, he starred in a show for BBC TV called The Valiant Varneys (1964–65), performing multiple characters in front of a live audience. After that followed another comedy role in Beggar My Neighbour (1966–68); this also starred Pat Coombs, June Whitfield, and Peter Jones. Pat Coombs played the wife of Varney's character. Varney featured in The Great St Trinian's Train Robbery (1966) with Frankie Howerd, Dora Bryan and George Cole.

The world's first voucher-based cash dispensing machine was installed at the Enfield Town branch of Barclays Bank. Varney was living in Enfield at the time and for publicity purposes he was photographed making the first withdrawal from the machine on Tuesday 27 June 1967.

Varney's most successful lead role was in the LWT sitcom On the Buses (1969–73) as bus driver Stan Butler. Varney took considerable lengths to prepare for the role, even attempting to gain a public service vehicle licence so that he could be filmed driving on the open road. However, Varney was not insured so LWT had to employ professional drivers for these scenes. Three spin-off films were made — On the Buses (1971), Mutiny on the Buses (1972) and Holiday on the Buses (1973). Varney was 52 when the first series was recorded, although his character Stan, who lived with his mother and often tried to attract young women, was implied to be aged around 35. Varney was only eleven years younger than Doris Hare, the main actress who played Stan's mother, and some twenty-one years older than Anna Karen who played his sister.

Varney left the series midway through its last season, hoping to move on to films and other projects. Ultimately, he only appeared in one further non-Buses film, The Best Pair of Legs in the Business (1973), and two television series, both made by ATV for the ITV network: an eponymously titled sketch show (1973–74) and another sitcom, Down the 'Gate (1975–76), which was set in Billingsgate Fish Market. However neither series replicated his success with On the Buses, and after Down the Gate was dropped after twelve episodes, Varney did not star in another television series. LWT revived The Rag Trade in 1977 but Varney did not reprise his role.

He later worked as an entertainer on cruise ships and toured Australia with his one-man show. He told an interviewer, "Whatever I did after On the Buses, nobody wanted to know about it. But I can't knock the programme because it brought me offers to do concert tours in Australia, New Zealand and Canada."

At the height of his fame he was a subject of the television programme This Is Your Life on 20 May 1970 when he was surprised by Eamonn Andrews, making further appearances in programmes featuring Doris Hare, Douglas Bader, June Whitfield and Anthony Newley.

Varney released several LP albums during his career - This Is Reg Varney On The 88s at Abbey Road on Columbia in 1972; Reg's Party - Reg Varney Plays And Sings on EMI-One-Up label in 1973; and A Variety of Varney on Astor in 1976.

Retirement and death 
Varney had a heart attack in 1965, and in 1981 he suffered a more serious one. He then contracted a severe viral infection, which for three years made working difficult for him. In 1989, he suffered a stroke, which left him with an uneven heartbeat. Subsequently, he divided his time between his home in a small village (Stoke Fleming) near Dartmouth and a villa in Malta.

Varney moved to Devon in the late 1980s and lived alone after his wife, Lilian Emma Varney died in East Devon in 2002, aged 87.

In his retirement years, Varney painted local landscapes in oil, with many to professional standard; some of his works were exhibited in London.

Varney died aged 92 in a nursing home in Budleigh Salterton, Devon, on 16 November 2008, following a chest infection.

In 2016, 100 years after Varney was born, an exhibition called "Before the Buses" was commissioned by his only child, his daughter Jeanne.

Partial filmography
 Crock Of Gold (1948) (TV film) – Harry Pickering
 Miss Robin Hood (1952) – Dennis
 Puss in Boots (1961) (TV film) – Jolly the jester
 Joey Boy (1965) – Rabbit Malone
 The Great St Trinian's Train Robbery (1966) – Gilbert
 On the Buses (1971) – Stan Butler
 Mutiny on the Buses (1972) – Stan Butler
 Go for a Take (1972) – Wilfred Stone
 The Best Pair of Legs in the Business (1973) – Sherry Sheridan
 Holiday on the Buses (1973) – Stan Butler
 The Plank (1979) – Window cleaner

Selected television roles

Further reading 
 Downs, Michael (2016). Our Little Clown: A Centenary Tribute to Entertainer Reg Varney. Fairlynch Museum.
 Varney, Reg (1990).  The Little Clown: An Autobiography. Hodder & Stoughton.

References

External links

Reg Varney's 1972 album 'On the 88’s at Abbey Road'

1916 births
2008 deaths
Military personnel from Essex
English male stage actors
English male television actors
English male film actors
People from Canning Town
Infectious disease deaths in England
British Army personnel of World War II
Royal Engineers soldiers
British male pianists
20th-century English painters
English male painters
21st-century English painters
20th-century pianists
20th-century British musicians
British male comedy actors
20th-century British male musicians
Columbia Records artists
EMI Records artists
20th-century English male artists
21st-century English male artists